Virginia Shanta Klinekole (June 13, 1924 – March 13, 2011), born Virginia Shanta, was a Mescalero Apache politician from New Mexico. She was elected as the first woman president of the Mescalero Apache Tribe, and served on the Tribal Council for nearly 30 years. She was known for being the first elected female leader of a major tribe, and for her work in preserving the Apache language.

Early life and education
She was born Virginia Shanta and raised in Three Rivers, New Mexico, where she lived all of her life. She attended local and boarding schools. Shanta was reared in the Roman Catholic faith.

Career
Klinkole worked as the Tularosa Public School Educational Liaison for the Mescalero Tribe, and strongly supported education for the children of the reservation, working to preserve the Apache language. She was "a member of the Tularosa School Board in the late 1960s and served on the Mescalero Apache School Board in the 1980s and 90s. She served on the New Mexico Indian Education Advisory Council in the 1980s and received the third annual governor's award for outstanding New Mexican women in 1988."

In 1959 she was elected as the first woman president of the Mescalero Apache, becoming "the first woman elected to lead any major tribe in the United States."

Following her term, she was repeatedly elected as a member of the Mescalero Apache Tribal Council. She served as a member until 1986, taking part in every aspect of managing the reservation.

Marriage and family
She married Bruce W. Klinekole, who was a survivor of the Bataan Death March.  They had four children: Bruce W. Klinekole II, Gregg A. Klinekole, Gina R. Klinekole, and Ruth "Wonzie" Klinekole Tiger. Her granddaughter Lindsey Shakespeare is a beadwork artist and doll maker.

References

1924 births
2011 deaths
Presidents of the Mescalero Apache
School board members in New Mexico
Women in New Mexico politics
Female Native American leaders
People from Otero County, New Mexico
20th-century American women politicians
20th-century American politicians
Native American women in politics
20th-century Native American women
20th-century Native Americans
21st-century Native American women
21st-century Native Americans